The Republican Party (PR) was a conservative-liberal political party in France founded in 1977. It replaced the National Federation of the Independent Republicans that was founded in 1966.  It was created by the then-President of France, Valéry Giscard d'Estaing. It was known to be conservative in domestic, social and economic policies, pro-NATO, and pro-European.

In 1978, the Republican Party allied with centrist groups to form the Union for French Democracy (UDF), a confederation created in order to support President Giscard d'Estaing and counterbalance the influence of the Gaullist Rally for the Republic (RPR) over the French centre-right.  However, after Giscard d'Estaing's defeat at the 1981 presidential election, the PR gravitated away from its founder and a new generation of politicians, led by François Léotard, took the lead.

This group called la bande à Léo ("Léo(tard)'s band"), advocated an alliance with the RPR and covertly supported RPR leader Jacques Chirac's candidacy in the 1988 presidential election, against the official UDF candidate Raymond Barre.

During the 1995 presidential campaign, the PR divided again between the two main centre-right candidates: François Léotard and Gérard Longuet supported Edouard Balladur while Alain Madelin and Jean-Pierre Raffarin supported Jacques Chirac, who won.

Until the split of the UDF confederation in 1998, the Republican Party was its liberal component, advocating economic liberalism. In 1997, it was replaced by Liberal Democracy (DL) led by Alain Madelin.

Presidents

Independent Republicans
Valéry Giscard d'Estaing (1966–74)
Michel Poniatowski (1975–77)

Republican Party
Jean-Pierre Soisson (1977–88)
François Léotard (1988–90)
Gérard Longuet (1990–95)
François Léotard (1995–97)
Alain Madelin (1997)

References

Defunct political parties in France
Political parties of the French Fifth Republic
Defunct liberal political parties
Conservative liberal parties
Right-wing parties in France
Political parties established in 1977
Political parties disestablished in 1997
1977 establishments in France
1997 disestablishments in France
Valéry Giscard d'Estaing